Roydon United Reformed Church is located in Harlow Road, Roydon, Essex, England.

History
Roydon United Reformed church originated in 1798, when James Brown of Harlow opened a Baptist meeting house in Harlow Road, Roydon. It was reconstituted in 1811 as an Independent church. In 1851 the original building was replaced with a new chapel and soon after that the church was affiliated to the Essex Congregational Union. A manse was built east of the church in 1868. In 1933 the church was altered and enlarged. It had 31 members in 1981.

In 2011 the church held a celebration weekend, to celebrate the 200 year anniversary of the formation of an Independent (Congregational) Church in Roydon.

References

Churches in Epping Forest District
United Reformed churches in England
Roydon, Essex